Yer Bird Records is a Calgary, Alberta-based independent record label. Founded by Morgan Galen King in 2004 in Charlottesville, Pennsylvania. King partnered with photographer Benjamin Gallman and Yer Bird Records moved from Charlottesville to Philadelphia, Pennsylvania, and finally settled in Calgary, Alberta, Canada, in early 2010. The new label owners are Sandy & Judy Smith and Sandy also operates the music blog Slowcoustic.

Yer Bird's first released record was Sounds Like Fall's The Wolf is at the Door, which was released on July 7, 2005. Sounds Like Fall is the performing name of Iowan singer-songwriter Joe Young who had extensively toured the Midwest with Alternative country band Moonshine Radio. The album was distributed through Miles of Music and Carrot Top Records's CTD in the United States, and through Smart Choice in the United Kingdom.

The following year the label released North Dakotan songwriter Nic Garcia's third full-length album, The Desperate Ones, in January 2006. Prior to releasing on Yer Bird, Garcia had both self-released (The Blue Howl of 4 am (2003), Sheep & Wolf (2004)) and worked with notable Midwest labels Supermedic Records (5 Songs (2002)) and Abandoned Scout Camp (Great Distance, (2003)).

To help promote an expansion of the website Yer Bird hosted a free digital download of Sounds Like Fall's Early Recordings which was a collection of home recordings prior to the sessions for The Wolf is at the Door. In July 2006, Philadelphia songwriter Hezekiah Jones' (Raphael Cutrufello of StillWillis) first album, Hezekiah Jones Says You're A-Ok, was released.

Released in 2007 was a compilation album entitled Folk Music for the End of the World which features tracks by notable songwriters Matthew Ryan, J. Tillman, Hayden, The Hotel Ghost (who would go on perform as Cold Specks), as well as other songwriters, with a cover painted by Kathleen Lolley (My Morning Jacket's Z). Following that release, in April, Yer Bird released J. Tillman's fourth full-length album entitled Cancer and Delirium. The end of 2007 saw the first EP release, Hezekiah Jones' Come to Our Pool Party. Texan songwriter Blackbird Harmony released his second album, Hardwood Exits, in 2008 featuring harmony and duet vocals by Bosque Brown. In October that same year, Yer Bird released The Gunshy's new albums which included the new EP I Gave Too Much Time to the Wine as well as all of his previous EP releases.  In 2009 the third release from the label from staple Hezekiah Jones Bread of Teeth alongside a limited CDR pressing of newcomer Luke Elliot entitled In Our Embrace.

Releases
 Sounds Like Fall – The Wolf is at the Door  (2005) YB001
 Nic Garcia – The Desperate Ones  (2006) YB002
 Sounds Like Fall – Early Recordings  (2006) YB000-D
 Hezekiah Jones – Hezekiah Says You're A-Ok (2006) YB003
 Folk Music for the End of the World – compilation (2007) YB004
 J. Tillman – Cancer and Delirium  (2007) YB005
 Hezekiah Jones – Come to Our Pool Party  (2007) YB006
 Chauchat – Upon Thousands (2008) YB007
 Blackbird Harmony – Hardwood Exits (2008) YB008
 The Gunshy – I Gave Too Much Time to the Wine (2008) YB009
 Hezekiah Jones – Bread of Teeth EP (2009) YB010
 Luke Elliot – In Our Embrace (2009) YB011
 Ghosts I've Met – Payphone Patience (2010) YB012
 Folk Music For What Lies Ahead – compilation (2010) YB013
 Caleb Coy – Wild Desert Rose (2010) YB000-D4
 White Pines – The Falls (2010) YB014
 Greater Pacific – "Rainfall" (2011) YB000-D5
 Hezekiah Jones – "Have You Seen Our New Fort" (2011) YB015
 Ghosts I've Met – "From A Spark" (2011) YB016
 Pickering Pick – "Tiger Balm" (2011) YB000-D6
 Pickering Pick – "(tropic)" (2013) YB022

The Yer Bird Aviary
On September 8, 2008, Yer Bird launched The Aviary, an early experiment with a subscription-based music service. Due to the label changing ownership and web hosting, the platform to support the Aviary project was closed on March 6, 2010.

See also 
 List of record labels

References

External links 
 Official site
 The Yer Bird Aviary
 Yer Bird music blog
 Yer Bird releases indexed by Allmusic
 An Aquarium Drunkard interview, by Justin Gage
 Short label critique and release announcement on Songs: Illinois

Record labels established in 2004
Canadian independent record labels
Canadian country music record labels
Companies based in Calgary